Festival of Cinema NYC (previously the Kew Gardens Festival of Cinema) is an international film festival held in New York City for 10 days beginning on the first Friday of August . Since 2017, the festival has screened over 400 films from 40 different countries, by independent filmmakers.  It was originally founded by festival director, Jayson Simba, as Kew Gardens Festival of Cinema taking place in Kew Gardens, Queens, New York. However, following the success of its inaugural year in 2017, Regal Cinemas became a sponsor and the Festival rebranded as Festival of Cinema NYC, moving to its new home in Forest Hills, Queens.  It was first established in 2016 to provide an alternative to Tribeca Film Festival and New York Film Festival according to The Wall Street Journal.

Sponsors 
Sponsors for Festival of Cinema NYC include the New York City Mayor's Office of Media and Entertainment, the Queens Economic Development Corporation, Regal Cinemas, Plaxall, Maspeth Federal Spacings Bank, SAG-AFTRA, the Queens Museum, the Queens Library, Moviemaker Magazine, Variety 411, Final Draft, Simple DCP, Soundview Media Partners, Synimatica, The Acting Studio NYC, Seed & Spark, Yelp, and Big City Graphics.

Panelists 
Past panelists and Jury Board members have included Anna Garduno, Executive Producer at Netflix; Charles E. Williams, two-time Emmy Award winner at CBS, Doug LeClaire, founder of Asbury Shorts USA, among many others.

Selected film highlights 
The 2019 festival opened with Camilo Vila's 5th of July.  Its closing night selections included Esmé von Hoffman’s premiere of Ovid and the Art of Love starring Corbin Bleu, John Savage and Tara Summers and Santiago Rizzi’s “Quest- The Truth Always Rises”.

The 2022 festival opened with Casey Nelson and Marchelle Thurman's Black, White and the Greys and closed with Michael Glover Smith's Relative.

References

External links 

Film festivals in New York City